Attilio R. "Pop" Frassinelli (August 7, 1907 – February 9, 1976) was an American politician who was the 98th lieutenant governor of Connecticut from 1967 to 1971.

Early life
Frassinelli was born August 7, 1907, in Stafford Springs, Tolland County, Connecticut.

Political and business career
Frassinelli graduated from the Metropolitan School of Accounting in Boston, Massachusetts, and was in the insurance business. Frassinelli served in the Connecticut House of Representatives from 1947 to 1953. He was a delegate to the Democratic National Convention from Connecticut in 1952 and alternate delegate in 1956 and 1960. Frassinelli served as selectman and on the board of education in 1932. From 1967 to 1971, he was the last of four consecutive Lieutenant Governors of Connecticut of governor John N. Dempsey, who had been a governor since 1961.

See also
List of governors of Connecticut

References

1907 births
1976 deaths
American people of Italian descent
People from Stafford Springs, Connecticut
Businesspeople from Connecticut
School board members in Connecticut
Democratic Party members of the Connecticut House of Representatives
Lieutenant Governors of Connecticut
20th-century American politicians
20th-century American businesspeople